is a former Japanese football player.

Playing career
Aizawa was born in Niigata on January 5, 1982. After graduating from high school, he joined newly was promoted to J1 League club, Kawasaki Frontale in 2000. However he could not play at all in the match in 2000 and the club was relegated to J2 League from 2001. Although he played many matches in summer 2001, he could hardly play in the match behind Takeshi Urakami and Shinya Yoshihara until 2004. The club won the champions in 2004 and was promoted to J1 from 2005. From 2005, he battles with Yoshihara for the position and became a regular goalkeeper in July 2005. However he lost regular position behind Yoshihara in September 2006 and he could hardly play in the match behind new member Eiji Kawashima in 2007. In 2008, he moved to J2 club Cerezo Osaka on loan. He battles with Hiromasa Yamamoto for the position and played many matches. In 2009, he returned to Kawasaki Frontale. Although he could not play at all in the match behind Kawashima until May 2010, he became a regular goalkeeper from July instead Kawashima moved to Belgium. However he lost regular position behind Rikihiro Sugiyama in September 2011. In 2012, he moved to J2 club FC Machida Zelvia. Although he player regular player until April 2012, he could hardly play in the match behind Tomohito Shugyo from April and the club was relegated to Japan Football League from 2013. In 2013, he played many matches as regular goalkeeper. In 2014, he moved to J1 club Shimizu S-Pulse. However he could hardly play in the match behind Masatoshi Kushibiki. In 2015, he moved to J2 club Tokushima Vortis. However he could not play many matches behind Toru Hasegawa and Yuji Kajikawa. He retired end of 2017 season.

Club statistics

References

External links

1982 births
Living people
Association football people from Niigata Prefecture
Japanese footballers
J1 League players
J2 League players
Japan Football League players
Kawasaki Frontale players
Cerezo Osaka players
FC Machida Zelvia players
Shimizu S-Pulse players
Tokushima Vortis players
Association football goalkeepers